The following is a list of indoor arenas in Canada with a capacity of at least 1,000 for sporting events. The arenas in the table are ranked by capacity; the arenas with the highest capacities are listed first.

Current arenas
Canada's largest indoor arenas by seating capacity for ice hockey. Rows shaded in yellow indicates arenas that are home to an NHL and/or NBA franchise.

Historical arenas

Arena Gardens/Mutual Street Arena – Toronto, Ontario
Barton Street Arena – Hamilton, Ontario
Cahill Stadium – Summerside, Prince Edward Island
Chilliwack Coliseum – Chilliwack, British Columbia
Colisée Pepsi – Quebec City, Quebec
Dalhousie Memorial Arena – Halifax, Nova Scotia
Dartmouth Arena – Dartmouth, Nova Scotia
Denman Arena – Vancouver, British Columbia
Dey's Arena – Ottawa, Ontario
Edmonton Gardens – Edmonton, Alberta
Hambly Arena – Oshawa, Ontario
Aréna Jacques Plante - Shawinigan, Quebec
Jubilee Arena – Montreal, Quebec
Maple Leaf Gardens – Toronto, Ontario
Medicine Hat Arena - Medicine Hat, Alberta
Memorial Stadium – St. John's, Newfoundland and Labrador
Montreal Arena – Montreal, Quebec
Montreal Forum – Montreal, Quebec
Mount Royal Arena – Montreal, Quebec
Northlands Coliseum – Edmonton, Alberta 
Oshawa Civic Auditorium – Oshawa, Ontario
Ottawa Auditorium – Ottawa, Ontario
Patrick Arena – Victoria, British Columbia
Quebec Arena – Quebec City, Quebec
Quebec Skating Rink – Quebec City, Quebec
Regina Exhibition Stadium – Regina, Saskatchewan
Saskatoon Arena – Saskatoon, Saskatchewan
Sault Memorial Gardens – Sault Ste. Marie, Ontario
Shea's Amphitheatre – Winnipeg, Manitoba
Stampede Corral - Calgary, Alberta
Victoria Memorial Arena – Victoria, British Columbia
Victoria Skating Rink – Montreal, Quebec
Winnipeg Arena – Winnipeg, Manitoba

Other arenas
Olympic Oval – Calgary, Alberta
Stephenville Dome – Stephenville, Newfoundland and Labrador

See also
 List of stadiums in Canada
 List of indoor arenas by capacity

References

 
Indoor arenas
Canada
Indoor